Peter Marshall (born 12 May 1971 in Nottingham, United Kingdom) is a former professional squash player from England.

With his unique double-handed playing style, Marshall finished runner-up to the great Pakistani player Jansher Khan at the World Open in 1994 and the British Open in 1995. When he reached the World No. 2 ranking behind Jansher in November 1994, many observers felt he seemed a strong candidate to displace the aging Pakistani champion as World No. 1. However, in 1995, Marshall was afflicted with glandular fever, the effects of which meant he was unable to play top-level squash for two years.

Marshall returned to the professional tour in 1997, re-claiming his place in the England squad which went on to win the World Team Squash Championships title in Malaysia. He broke back into the world's top-10 in 1999, and won his third British National Championship title in February 2000. He was protecting a remarkable record, having been unbeaten in that event since December 1989.

Early career 
Marshall won British junior titles at all age-groups (under-12, under-14, under-16 and under-19). He first became England's No.1 in November 1991, holding the position unchallenged for four years.

His coach and mentor was the six-time British champion Jonah Barrington.

In 1989, Marshall won the British Open U19. The following year, he became World Masters U23 Champion.

His first full year of international competition was 1991, but it was in the 1994-95 season that Marshall's promise was most powerfully demonstrated. He was a finalist in five PSA Super Series events leading up to and including the 1995 British Open.

Marshall was British and European No 1 for several years.

After retiring from the professional tour 
Marshall released an autobiography about his battle against chronic fatigue syndrome in 2001 entitled Shattered: A Champion's Fight Against a Mystery Illness.

Marshall has a BSc in Physiotherapy from the University of Nottingham and an Executive MBA from  Imperial College London. He currently works for Ernst & Young.

In 2008, Marshall won the Over-35 British National Championship in Manchester. He also won the British Open Masters Over-40 in 2016 and 2018.

Marshall is an Ambassador for Access Sport, a charity focused on providing children from disadvantaged areas with access to local sports and promoting the real difference sport can make within deprived communities.

He is also a trustee for the England Squash Foundation, a national charity with a vision to enhance young people's lives through squash.

In May 2015, Marshall was given a Lifetime Achievement Award at the World Squash Awards for his achievements, continued support and commitment to the game.

References

External links 
 
 
 

English male squash players
Sportspeople from Nottingham
Alumni of the University of Nottingham
People educated at Millfield
1971 births
Living people
British physiotherapists
People with chronic fatigue syndrome